St Wilfrid's Church, Scrooby is a Grade II* listed parish church in the Church of England in Scrooby.

History

The church was built in the 15th century, and was restored by the Victorians in 1864 after many years of disrepair. The church is noted for its octagonal spire.

Scrooby harboured a Separatist Puritan group, 1606–8, which fled to Holland in 1608 and then in 1620 sailed to America in the Mayflower. William Brewster, one of the Pilgrim Fathers and a ruling elder, worshipped in Scrooby Church.

Present day
Today, St Wilfrid's is in the Benefice of Blyth and Scrooby with Ranskill. Services from a central Anglican tradition are still held at St Wilfrid. An hour-long prayer service takes place on the first Sunday of the month, and Sunday morning worship takes place on the first and third Sunday of the month. The church congregation consists mostly of village residents.

Organ

The church contains an organ dating from 1871 by Gray and Davison.

References

Church of England church buildings in Nottinghamshire
Scrooby
Scrooby